Kalle Kainuvaara (19 March 1891 – 21 October 1943) was a Finnish diver who competed in the 1912 Summer Olympics and 1920 Summer Olympics. He was born in Kuopio, Finland.

In 1912 he competed in both the men's 10 metre platform and men's plain high events.  In 1920 he also competed in the men's 10 metre platform and men's plain high events, as well as in the modern pentathlon.

He was killed in action during World War II.

References

1891 births
1943 deaths
Finnish male divers
Finnish male modern pentathletes
Olympic divers of Finland
Olympic modern pentathletes of Finland
Divers at the 1912 Summer Olympics
Divers at the 1920 Summer Olympics
Modern pentathletes at the 1920 Summer Olympics
Finnish military personnel killed in World War II
People from Kuopio
Sportspeople from North Savo